Eilean Tigh is a tidal island in the Sound of Raasay of Scotland, that lies between Rona and Raasay.

Approximately  in extent, the island was once settled and the ruins of various structures are still visible at the south end. "Eilean Tigh" is a Gaelic name that means "house island" or "home island".

It is a rugged island and the coastline is largely cliff-lined and rocky. Eilean Tigh is connected to the northern tip of neighbouring Raasay at low tides by a rocky ledge that crosses Caol Eilean Tigh. On the Rona side are Garbh Eilean (rough island) and Eilean Seamraig.

There are good anchorages nearby off Eilean Fladday and Rona, but the nearest road stops at Arnish on Raasay, from where it is about a two-hour walk to Eilean Tigh. The northwestern tip of the island is Rubha na Cloich' Uaine – the point of the green stone.

Notes

Uninhabited islands of Highland (council area)
Former populated places in Scotland
Raasay